President Gari Pellam is a 1992 Indian Telugu-language film directed by A. Kodandarami Reddy and produced by V. Doraswamy Raju under VMC Productions. It stars Nagarjuna and Meena, with music composed by M. M. Keeravani. The movie was later dubbed into Tamil as Thalaivar Pondatti. This film recorded as a super hit.

Plot
Raja's (Nagarjuna) brother Chandraiah (Chandra Mohan) works as a servant under Devudu (Satyanarayana), the president of the village. Meena is the daughter of Devudu and has arguments with Raja. To take revenge on him, Meena acts as she loves him and insults him in front of the villagers. Later Raja stands as president candidate opposite Devudu and challenges him that if he wins, Raja will marry his daughter to him, but if Raja loses, he should leave the village. Raja wins as president. The rest of the movie is about whether he will marry Meena and how he will teach Devudu a lesson.

Cast

Nagarjuna as Raja
Meena as Swapna
Satyanarayana as Devudu
Srikanth as Narendra
Chandra Mohan as Chandraiah
Kota Srinivasa Rao as Nadamuni
Bramhanandam as Vadatala Vundellu
Ali as Raja's friend 
Raja as Rambabu 
Chidatala Appa Rao as Sambrani
Chitti Babu as Raja's friend
Gautam Raju as Nandan Rao 
Garimalla Viswaswara Rao as Raja's friend 
Gadiraju Subba Rao as Puvvulapalem President 
Narsing Yadav as Bheemanna
Annapoorna as Janaki 
Sudha as Lakshmi 
Haritha as Seetha 
Disco Shanthi as Chemki Puvvu (item number)
Baby Sunayana as Bujji

Soundtrack

The music was composed by M. M. Keeravani. Lyrics written by Veturi. Music released on AKASH Audio Company.

References

External links
 

1992 films
Films directed by A. Kodandarami Reddy
Films scored by M. M. Keeravani
1990s Telugu-language films
Indian drama films